Peshterica is a former village in Municipality of Prilep, North Macedonia. It is now submerged under the Lake of Prilep.

Villages in Prilep Municipality